Reshma Bhandari (born 3 January 1994) is a National Volleyball player of Nepal. She plays from Armed Police Force Nepal's APF Club of 2013 (2070 in Nepali calendar).

Early life
She was born on 3 January 1994 and is from Kathmandu, Nepal. She studied at Intensive International College

References

Nepalese women's volleyball players
People from Kathmandu
1994 births
Living people
Nepalese beach volleyball players